The 2011 Kashiwa Reysol season is Kashiwa Reysol's first season in J.League Division 1 since 2009 and 39th overall in the Japanese top flight. It also includes the 2011 J.League Cup, and the 2011 Emperor's Cup.

As a result of their first J.League title win (their second overall counting the 1972 JSL title), they were participants in the 2011 FIFA Club World Cup as Japan were the tournament hosts. Their title win was the first immediate win for a second-tier champion.

Players

Competitions

J.League

League table

Results summary

Results by round

J.League Cup

Emperor's Cup

FIFA Club World Cup

References
2011 J.League Division 1 Fixture
2011 Kashiwa Reysol season at Soccerway

Kashiwa Reysol
Kashiwa Reysol seasons